Philip Edward "Brave" Davis  (born 7 June 1951) is a Bahamian politician serving as the Prime Minister of the Bahamas since 2021. He has been the Member of Parliament (MP) for Cat Island, Rum Cay & San Salvador since May 2002.

Davis was Deputy Prime Minister to Perry Christie and Minister of Public Works and Urban Development from 2012 to 2017. He then served as Leader of the Opposition from May 2017 to September 2021, when he led the Progressive Liberal Party to victory and was subsequently sworn in as Prime Minister.

Early life
Davis was born in a house off Wulff Road, the eldest of eight children to Dorothy (née Smith), a domestic worker from Alexander, Great Exuma and Brave Edward Davis, a firefighter from Old Bight, Cat Island. Davis spent his early childhood living with his grandparents on Cat Island where he attended Old Bight All Age School. Upon returning to Nassau, he continued his education at Eastern Schools and graduated from St. John's College. Growing up in a poor family, Davis worked a number of odd jobs from the age of 7 to make ends meet.

Professional career
After finishing his O Levels, Davis was a construction worker until he landed a job at Barclays. The job was brief, as his supervisors encouraged him to pursue law. He was first invited for an interview to become an articled clerk at Davis Bethel's law chambers. Although the gig fell through, he ended up a clerk at Wallace-Whitfield & Barnwell later that year and completed his legal studies in 3 years. Davis was called to the Bahamas Bar in 1975, where he served two terms as Vice President and one as President of the Bahamas Bar Association. He became a long-term partner at Christie, Ingraham & Co, and was appointed Magistrate. He sat on the CARICOM Council of Legal Education.

Political career
Davis got involved in the Progressive Liberal Party at a young age, volunteering as a campaign helper in the 1967 general election. He was first elected as the Member of Parliament (MP) for Cat Island, Rum Cay & San Salvador in a 1992 by-election. Although he lost his seat in 1997, he regained it in 2002 and has held onto it since.

Prior to becoming Prime Minister, Davis was the Leader of the Opposition as well as of the Progressive Liberal Party having been elected at the party's convention in October 2017. Prior to his election as party leader, he was elected deputy-leader, at the Party's Convention in 2009, when the PLP won the 2012 general elections, he became the Bahamas' Deputy Prime Minister and Minister for Public Works and Urban Development, to which he served up until 2017, when the PLP was once again defeated in the polls.

He was appointed a Queen's Counsel (QC) in 2015.

In September 2021, the Progressive Liberal Party defeated the ruling Free National Movement in a snap election, as the economy struggles to recover from its deepest crash since at least 1971. Progressive Liberal Party (PLP) won 32 of the 39 seats in the House of Assembly. Free National Movement (FNM) took the remaining seats. On 17 September 2021, the Leader of the Progressive Liberal Party (PLP) Phillip “Brave” Davis was sworn in as the new Prime Minister of Bahamas to succeed Hubert Minnis.

Minister of Public Works and Urban Development
As Minister of Public Works and Urban Development, he oversaw and ensured around some 1000 homes, in both the Family Islands and New Providence were provided with indoor toilets and potable water, additionally, he oversaw infrastructure developments across the islands, such as building of roads, rebuilding of seawalls, bringing lights to Family Islands airports, and repairing of buildings and docks damaged by Hurricanes. He established the Urban Renewal Small Homes Repairs Program, which saw more than 1000 homeowners and employed thousands of contractors and tradespersons.

Prime Minister
After winning the 2021 election in a landslide, Davis was appointed Prime Minister.

Personal life
Davis is married to Ann Marie Davis, women's rights activist and treasurer of the Bahamas Humane Society. They have six children and are practicing Anglicans at St. Christopher's. Davis is a member of Toastmasters Club 1600 and a keen sportsman interested in baseball, softball and swimming.

References

Notes

1951 births
Living people
20th-century Bahamian lawyers
21st-century Bahamian lawyers
21st-century Bahamian politicians
Bahamian Anglicans
Bahamian Queen's Counsel
Deputy Prime Ministers of the Bahamas
Finance ministers of the Bahamas
Members of the House of Assembly of the Bahamas
People from Cat Island, Bahamas
People from Nassau, Bahamas
Progressive Liberal Party politicians
Prime Ministers of the Bahamas